Maggie Sansone is a hammered dulcimer player and recording artist from Miami, Florida.

Biography 
Sansone started recording her music in 1984. Since then, she has made over a dozen recordings, both solo and as a guest artist or in collaboration with numerous recording artists such as Bonnie Rideout, Al Petteway and Ensemble Galilei.

Although she is perhaps best known for her hammered dulcimer recordings, she also plays the piano, guitar, mandolin, and Northumbrian small-pipes.

Sansone has performed at the Maryland Renaissance Festival for more than twenty years. She currently resides in Maryland.

Maggie's Music 
Sansone operates her own music label, Maggie's Music. The label features over fifty recordings of Celtic and contemporary acoustic music featuring twelve recording artists that include Al Petteway, Amy White, Bonnie Rideout, Robin Bullock, Karen Ashbrook, Paul Oorts, the City of Washington Pipe Band, Ensemble Galilei, Sue Richards, Hesperus Early Music Ensemble with Tina Chancey and more.

Discography 
Hammer Dulcimer & Guitar (1984) cassette album: out of print, now included on Traditions
Hammered Dulcimer Traditions (1987) cassette album: out of print, now included on Traditions
Sounds of the Season, Vol. 1 (1988)
Traditions (1989)
Sounds of the Season, Vol. 2 (1990)
Mist & Stone (1990)
Music In The Great Hall: Instrumental Music From The Ancient Celtic Lands (with Ensemble Galilei) (1993)
Ancient Noels (with Ensemble Galilei) (1993)
Dance Upon The Shore (1994)
A Scottish Christmas ( 1996) (with Bonnie Rideout and Al Petteway)
A Traveler's Dream (1999)
Celtic Meditations: Into The Light (2001)
Merrily Greet the Time (2003) (with Sue Richards on Celtic harp)
Mystic Dance: A Celtic Celebration (2004)
A Celtic Fair (2007)
Wind Drift: Celtic grooves, mystic moods (2010)

References

External links
Official website
Maggie's Music, her record label

American folk musicians
Hammered dulcimer players
Living people
Year of birth missing (living people)